Ethan John Ingram (born 16 April 2003) is an English professional footballer who plays as a defender for  club West Bromwich Albion and the England national under-20 team.

Club career
Born in Gloucester, Ingram was scouted by one of West Bromwich Albion's development centre's aged 12, before joining their academy and signing a scholarship deal aged 16. He made his debut for the club on 25 August 2021, starting in a 6–0 EFL Cup second round defeat to Arsenal.
13th May 2022 Premier League Cup Final Wolves u23s v West Bromwich Albion u23s winning penalty scored by Ethan returning the Cup since 1968 when a cup was last won by West Bromwich Albion

International career
He has represented England at under-17 and under-18 international levels.

On 21 September 2022, Ingram made his England U20 debut as a substitute during a 3-0 victory over Chile at the Pinatar Arena.

Career statistics

Honours 
West Bromwich Albion U23

 Premier League Cup winner: 2021–22

References

External links

2003 births
Living people
English footballers
Footballers from Gloucester
Association football defenders
West Bromwich Albion F.C. players

England youth international footballers